Sinungaling Mong Puso is a 2016 Philippine television drama suspense series broadcast by GMA Network. It premiered on the network's Afternoon Prime line up and worldwide on GMA Pinoy TV from July 18, 2016 to October 28, 2016, replacing Hanggang Makita Kang Muli.

Urban Luzon ratings are provided by AGB Nielsen Philippines.

Series overview

Episodes

July 2016

August 2016

September 2016

October 2016

Episodes notes

References

Lists of Philippine drama television series episodes